The 1996 Lehigh Mountain Hawks football team was an American football team that represented Lehigh University during the 1996 NCAA Division I-AA football season. Lehigh finished third in the Patriot League. 

In their third year under head coach Kevin Higgins, the newly renamed Mountain Hawks compiled a 5–6 record. Brian Bartelle, Lance Eckenrode, Mark Miller and Doug Yates were the team captains.

The Mountain Hawks were outscored 264 to 208. Their 3–2 conference record, however, placed third in the six-team Patriot League standings. 

Lehigh's football team competed under a new name for the first time since 1914. The "Mountain Hawk" mascot had been introduced in November 1995, but the football team completed that season under its longstanding "Engineers" name. 

In the ensuing months, many fans and alumni were vocal about their attachment to the "Engineers" nickname and brown-and-white colors. As late as spring 1996, college administrators were reaffirming that Lehigh's teams were still officially known as "Engineers". By the start of the 1996 football season, however, the new identity had taken hold.

Lehigh played its home games at Goodman Stadium on the university's Goodman Campus in Bethlehem, Pennsylvania.

Schedule

References

Lehigh
Lehigh Mountain Hawks football seasons
Lehigh Engineers football